The National Inventor's Hall of Fame STEM High School is a public high school in the Akron Public School District that serves the city of Akron, Ohio since its creation in 2012. Their school colors are turquoise and chrome. Its predecessor was Central-Hower High School which served the city of Akron from 1970 until its closure at the end of the 2005-06 school year.

History

The National Inventors Hall of Fame STEM High School was created in 2012 as a special high school with emphasis on science, technology, engineering, and mathematics. Its predecessor, Central-Hower High School was created in 1970 when Akron Public Schools combined Central High School with Hower Vocational School into a new building on the site of the Central location.

The original Central building on Forge Street opened in 1886 and was initially named Akron High School. It was renamed Central High School in 1911 when the Akron Board of Education opened South High School.  Hower Vocational School was named after Milton Otis Hower (1858–1916), an Akron manufacturing leader who was an officer of the American Cereal Co. and multiple other enterprises. The school began in Perkins Elementary in 1927 and phased out the younger kids before becoming accredited in August 1935 as a vocational school.

Central and Hower both graduated their last independent classes in 1970. The combined student bodies were housed in Hower while the Central building was demolished and the new one was built. Central-Hower was constructed in 1973 and opened in September 1975. The Hower building was demolished in 1978.

Central-Hower closed at the end of the 2005–06 school year and was serving as the temporary facility for the East Community Learning Center until their building was renovated. After that was completed, Central-Hower housed the students from Buchtel High School while their building was renovated. Currently, the building now houses the National Inventor's Hall of Fame STEM High School.

Athletics

Prior to the merger, the Central Wildcats and Hower Buccaneers competed in the Akron City Series. After the merger, the Central–Hower Eagles also competed in the Akron City Series. Currently, the National Inventors Hall of Fame STEM High School does not have any athletic teams.

Notes and references

External links
 District website

High schools in Akron, Ohio
Public high schools in Ohio